Toblach is a comune/Gemeinde (municipality) in South Tyrol in northern Italy, located in the Puster Valley about  northeast of the city of Bolzano, on the border with Austria.

Geography

Toblach borders the following municipalities: Gsies, Innichen, Niederdorf, Prags, Auronzo di Cadore, Cortina d'Ampezzo and Innervillgraten (Austria).

The prominent mountain peaks the Tre Cime di Lavaredo (the Drei Zinnen in German) are located nearby. The Drava/Drau also flows from the nearby mountains; other rivers in the comune include the Rienz.

Frazioni
The municipality of Toblach contains the frazione (subdivisions, mainly villages and hamlets) Aufkirchen/Santa Maria and Wahlen/San Silvestro and the settlement of Schluderbach.

History
The locality is first being mentioned as in vico Duplago in a document issued by the bishopric of Freising as of 827.

Coat-of-arms
The escutcheon is divided vertically into two parts with a central circle, the colors are red and white alternating. It was the arms of the Lords of Herbstenburg who bought the castle in 1509 and ruled the village. The emblem was granted in 1967.

Artists
Here, in a tiny wood cabin in the pine forests close to Toblach, in the summers of 1908–10 Gustav Mahler composed his ninth symphony, the last he completed, and Das Lied von der Erde, and also began work on his tenth symphony.

Society

Linguistic distribution
In the 2011 census, 84.10% of the population declared that they belonged to the German-speaking community, 15.58% to the Italian and 0.32% to the Ladin.

Demographic evolution

Climate

Airport 
Approximately 1 km to the South of Toblach lies Toblach Airport Italy's northernmost airport. The small military airfield has a 700 m long and 50 m wide grass runway and is managed by the Italian Air Force's Airport Detachment Toblach. From May to October the airport is open for civilian traffic on weekends and holidays.

Sports 
Toblach is a regular host of FIS Cross-Country World Cup events and has hosted several stages of the Tour de Ski, a cross-country skiing stage event.

See also
Dürrensee

References

External links

 Homepage of the municipality

Municipalities of South Tyrol